The  has its source in Mount Eboshi (烏帽子岳 Eboshigatake) in the Shōkawa-chō area of Takayama, Gifu Prefecture, Japan. After flowing for  through the northern part of Gifu Prefecture and the western part of Toyama Prefecture, it empties into Toyama Bay.

River communities
The river passes through or forms the boundary of the communities listed below. The area through which the river flows in Gifu is referred to as Shirakawa-gō, while the area in Toyama is referred to as Gokayama. Both areas are UNESCO World Heritage Sites because of their gasshō-zukuri houses.

Gifu Prefecture
Takayama, Shirakawa (Ōno District)
Toyama Prefecture
Nanto, Tonami, Takaoka, Imizu

Tributary 
Toga  River
Kotori River

Dams
The river is extensively developed for water storage, flood control and hydroelectric power generation. There are 16 major dams in the basin, seven of them are on tributaries. The major dams collectively have an installed power generation capacity of 926 MW. Six other small hydroelectric plants total 30.6 MW in installed capacity. The 22 hydroelectric power stations in the Shō River basin have an installed capacity of 956.6 MW. The 16 major dams are listed below in order from downstream to upstream.

Toyama
Toyama/Gifu:
Gifu:

References

External links
 (confluence with Ibi River)

Rivers of Gifu Prefecture
Rivers of Toyama Prefecture
Rivers of Japan